WBVC was a freeform high school radio station located in Pomfret, Connecticut. Directly affiliated with Pomfret School, the station was funded through a gift from Bill and Virginia Cargill, whose initials, BVC, formed the station's call letters.

WBVC signed on in 2001. The station's license was surrendered to the Federal Communications Commission on April 28, 2022, and cancelled September 19, 2022.

References

External links

BVC
Pomfret, Connecticut
Radio stations established in 2001
2001 establishments in Connecticut
Radio stations disestablished in 2022
2022 disestablishments in Connecticut
Defunct radio stations in the United States
BVC
High school radio stations in the United States